Akhmed (Ahmad) Shiybudinovich Gadzhimagomedov (born 21 April 1990 in Dagestan) is a Russian freestyle wrestler. World bronze medalist 2018. He won bronze at the 2017 European Wrestling Championships in 74 kg. At the 2018 European Wrestling Championships in Kaspiysk, Gadzhimagomedov won gold. 4x Ivan Yayrgin GP winner.

Background
Akhmed was born in the village of Leninaul, Dagestan, to a Sunni Muslim family. He started training in freestyle wrestling at the age of 12.

He lives in Khasavyurt where he is coached by Magomed Guseinov and Gamzat Abbasov. Akhmed is International Master of Sports in freestyle wrestling.

Championships and achievements

2013 Ramzan Kadyrov & Adlan Varayev Cup – 1st place (74 kg)
2014 Intercontinental Cup – 1st place (74 kg)
2015 Ali Aliyev Memorial – 1st place (74 kg)
2015 Golden Grand Prix Ivan Yarygin – 1st place (74 kg)
2015 Russian Nationals – 3rd place (74 kg)
2015 Golden Grand-Prix Baku – 3rd place (74 kg)
2016 Golden Grand Prix Ivan Yarygin – 3rd place (74 kg)
2016 Ali Aliyev Memorial – 2nd place (74 kg)
2017 Golden Grand Prix Ivan Yarygin – 1st place (74 kg)
2017 European Championships – 3rd place (74 kg)
2018 Golden Grand Prix Ivan Yarygin – 1st place (79 kg)
2018 Dan Kolov & Nikola Petrov Cup – 1st place (79 kg)
2018 European Championships – 1st place (79 kg)
2018 Wrestling Championships – 3rd place (79 kg)
2019 Golden Grand Prix Ivan Yarygin – 1st place (79 kg)

Personal life
Gadzhimagomedov is a devout Sunni Muslim. His favorite wrestler is Murad Gaidarov.

References

1990 births
Living people
People from Khasavyurt
People from Kazbekovsky District
Russian people of Dagestani descent
Russian male sport wrestlers
Avar people
Russian Sunni Muslims
World Wrestling Championships medalists
European Wrestling Championships medalists
Sportspeople from Dagestan
20th-century Russian people
21st-century Russian people